The 1898 United States House of Representatives elections were held for the most part on November 8, 1898, with Oregon, Maine, and Vermont holding theirs early in either June or September. They were held during the middle of President William McKinley's first term. Elections were held for 357 seats of the United States House of Representatives, representing 45 states, to serve in the 56th United States Congress. Special elections were also held throughout the year.

As in many midterm elections, the President's Republican Party lost seats, but was able to hold a majority over the Democratic Party. The Populist Party also lost many seats, as their movement began to decline. This was likely because many Populists rallied behind William Jennings Bryan's increasingly powerful branch of the Democratic Party, which built the rural economic issues advocated by Populists into their platform. As a result, the Democrats won a number of Western seats as well many in the Mid-Atlantic.

Election summaries

The previous elections of 1896 saw the election of 24 Populists, 2 Silver Republicans, and a Silver Party member.

Special elections 

}

|-
! 
| William V. Sullivan
|  | Democratic
| 1896
|  | Incumbent resigned when appointed U.S. Senator.New member elected July 5, 1898.Democratic hold.
| nowrap | 

|-
! 

|-
! 

|-
! 

|-
! 

|-
! 
| William F. Love
|  | Democratic
| 1896
|  | Incumbent died October 16, 1898.New member elected November 29, 1898.Democratic hold.
| nowrap | 
|-
!
| John Simpkins
|  | Republican
| 1894
|  | Incumbent retired.New member elected.Republican hold.
| nowrap | 
|}

Election dates 
All the states held their elections November 8, 1898, except for 3 states, with 8 seats among them:

June 6: Oregon
September 6: Vermont
September 12: Maine

Alabama

Arkansas

California

}

|-
! 
| John All Barham
|  | Republican
| 1894
| Incumbent re-elected.
| nowrap | 

|-
! 
| Marion De Vries
|  | Democratic
| 1896
| Incumbent re-elected.
| nowrap | 

|-
! 
| Samuel G. Hilborn
|  | Republican
| 1894
|  | Incumbent lost renomination.New member elected.Republican hold
| nowrap | 

|-
! 
| James G. Maguire
|  | Democratic
| 1892
|  | Incumbent retired to run for California Governor.New member elected.Republican gain.
| nowrap | 

|-
! 
| Eugene F. Loud
|  | Republican
| 1890
| Incumbent re-elected.
| nowrap | 

|-
! 
| Charles A. Barlow
|  | Populist
| 1900
|  | Incumbent lost re-election.New member elected.Republican gain.
| nowrap | 

|-
! 
| Curtis H. Castle
|  | Populist
| 1896
|  | Incumbent lost re-election.New member elected.Republican gain.
| nowrap | 

|}

Colorado

Connecticut

Delaware

Florida

|-
! 
| Stephen M. Sparkman
|  | Democratic
| 1894
| Incumbent re-elected.
| nowrap | 

|-
! 
| Robert Wyche Davis
|  | Democratic
| 1896
| Incumbent re-elected.
| nowrap | 

|}

Georgia

Idaho 

|-
! 
| James Gunn
|  | Populist
| 1896
|  | Incumbent lost re-election.New member elected.Silver Republican gain.
| nowrap | 

|}

Illinois

Indiana

Iowa

Kansas

Kentucky

Louisiana

Maine

Maryland

Massachusetts 

|-
! 
| George P. Lawrence
|  | Republican
| 1897 (special)
| Incumbent re-elected.
| nowrap | 

|-
! 
| Frederick H. Gillett
|  | Republican
| 1892
| Incumbent re-elected.
| nowrap | 

|-
! 
| Joseph H. Walker
|  | Republican
| 1888
|  | Incumbent lost re-election.New member elected.Democratic gain.
| nowrap | 

|-
! 
| George W. Weymouth
|  | Republican
| 1896
| Incumbent re-elected.
| nowrap | 

|-
! 
| William S. Knox
|  | Republican
| 1894
| Incumbent re-elected.
| nowrap | 

|-
! 
| William H. Moody
|  | Republican
| 1895 (special)
| Incumbent re-elected.
| nowrap | 

|-
! 
| William Emerson Barrett
|  | Republican
| 1894
|  | Incumbent retired.New member elected.Republican hold.
| nowrap | 

|-
! 
| Samuel W. McCall
|  | Republican
| 1892
| Incumbent re-elected.
| nowrap | 

|-
! 
| John F. Fitzgerald
|  | Democratic
| 1894
| Incumbent re-elected.
| nowrap | 

|-
! 
| Samuel J. Barrows
|  | Republican
| 1896
|  | Incumbent lost re-election.New member elected.Democratic gain.
| nowrap | 

|-
! 
| Charles F. Sprague
|  | Republican
| 1892
| Incumbent re-elected.
| nowrap | 

|-
! 
| William C. Lovering
|  | Republican
| 1896
| Incumbent re-elected.
| nowrap | 

|-
! 
| William S. Greene
|  | Republican
| 1898 (special)
| Incumbent re-elected.
| nowrap | 

|}

Michigan

Minnesota

Mississippi 

|-
! 
| John M. Allen
|  | Democratic
| 1884
| Incumbent re-elected.
| nowrap | 

|-
! 
| Thomas Spight
|  | Democratic
| 1898 (special)
| Incumbent re-elected.
| nowrap | 

|-
! 
| Thomas C. Catchings
|  | Democratic
| 1884
| Incumbent re-elected.
| nowrap | 

|-
! 
| Andrew F. Fox
|  | Democratic
| 1896
| Incumbent re-elected.
| nowrap | 

|-
! 
| John S. Williams
|  | Democratic
| 1892
| Incumbent re-elected.
| nowrap | 

|-
! 
| colspan=3 | Vacant (incumbent died October 16, 1898)
|  | New member elected.Democratic hold.
| nowrap | 

|-
! 
| Patrick Henry
|  | Democratic
| 1896
| Incumbent re-elected.
| nowrap | 

|}

Missouri

Montana  

|-
! 
| Charles S. Hartman
|  | Silver Republican
| 1892
|  |Incumbent retired.New member elected.Democratic gain.
| nowrap | 

|}

Nebraska 

|-
! 
| Jesse B. Strode
|  | Republican
| 1894
|  | Incumbent retired.New member elected.Republican hold.
| nowrap | 

|-
! 
| David H. Mercer
|  | Republican
| 1892
| Incumbent re-elected.
| nowrap | 

|-
! 
| Samuel Maxwell
|  | Populist
| 1896
|  | Incumbent retired.New member elected.Democratic gain.
| nowrap | 

|-
! 
| William L. Stark
|  | Populist
| 1896
| Incumbent re-elected.
| nowrap | 

|-
! 
| Roderick Dhu Sutherland
|  | Populist
| 1896
| Incumbent re-elected.
| nowrap | 

|-
! 
| William L. Greene
|  | Populist
| 1896
| Incumbent re-elected.
| nowrap | 

|}

Nevada

New Hampshire

New Jersey

New York

North Carolina

North Dakota  

|-
! 
| Martin N. Johnson
|  | Republican
| 1890
|  | Incumbent retired to run for U.S. senator.New member elected.Republican hold.
| nowrap | 

|}

Ohio

Oregon 

|-
! 
| Thomas H. Tongue
|  | Republican
| 1896
| Incumbent re-elected.
| nowrap | 
|-
! 
| William R. Ellis
|  | Republican
| 1892
|  | Incumbent lost renomination.New member elected.Republican hold.
| nowrap | 

|}

Pennsylvania

Rhode Island

South Carolina 

|-
! 
| William Elliott
|  | Democratic
| 18861896
| Incumbent re-elected.
| nowrap | 

|-
! 
| W. Jasper Talbert
|  | Democratic
| 1892
| Incumbent re-elected.
| nowrap | 

|-
! 
| Asbury Latimer
|  | Democratic
| 1892
| Incumbent re-elected.
| nowrap | 

|-
! 
| Stanyarne Wilson
|  | Democratic
| 1894
| Incumbent re-elected.
| nowrap | 

|-
! 
| Thomas J. Strait
|  | Democratic
| 1892
|  | Incumbent lost renomination.New member elected.Democratic hold.
| nowrap | 

|-
! 
| James Norton
|  | Democratic
| 1897 (special)
| Incumbent re-elected.
| nowrap | 

|-
! 
| J. William Stokes
|  | Democratic
| 1894
| Incumbent re-elected.
| nowrap | 

|}

South Dakota 

|-
! rowspan=2 | 
| John Edward Kelley
|  | Populist
| 1896
|  | Incumbent lost re-election.New member elected.Republican gain.
| rowspan=2 nowrap | 

|-
| Freeman Knowles
|  | Populist
| 1896
|  | Incumbent lost re-election.New member elected.Republican gain.

|}

Tennessee  

|-
! 
| Walter P. Brownlow
|  | Republican
| 1896
| Incumbent re-elected.
| nowrap | 

|-
! 
| Henry R. Gibson
|  | Republican
| 1894
| Incumbent re-elected.
| nowrap | 

|-
! 
| John A. Moon
|  | Democratic
| 1896
| Incumbent re-elected.
| nowrap | 

|-
! 
| Benton McMillin
|  | Democratic
| 1878
|  |Incumbent retired to run for Governor.New member elected.Democratic hold.
|  nowrap | 

|-
! 
| James D. Richardson
|  | Democratic
| 1884
| Incumbent re-elected.
| nowrap | 

|-
! 
| John W. Gaines
|  | Democratic
| 1896
| Incumbent re-elected.
| nowrap | 

|-
! 
| Nicholas N. Cox
|  | Democratic
| 1890
| Incumbent re-elected.
| nowrap | 

|-
! 
| Thetus W. Sims
|  | Democratic
| 1896
| Incumbent re-elected.
| nowrap | 

|-
! 
| Rice A. Pierce
|  | Democratic
| 1896
| Incumbent re-elected.
| nowrap | 

|-
! 
| Edward W. Carmack
|  | Democratic
| 1896
| Incumbent re-elected.
| 

|}

Texas

Utah

Vermont

Virginia

Washington

West Virginia 

|-
! 
| Blackburn B. Dovener
|  | Republican
| 1894
| Incumbent re-elected.
| nowrap | 

|-
! 
| Alston G. Dayton
|  | Republican
| 1894
| Incumbent re-elected.
| nowrap | 

|-
! 
| Charles Dorr
|  | Republican
| 1896
|  | Incumbent retired.New member elected.Democratic gain.
| nowrap | 

|-
! 
| Warren Miller
|  | Republican
| 1894
|  | Incumbent retired.New member elected.Republican hold.
| nowrap | 

|}

Wisconsin

Wyoming  

|-
! 
| John E. Osborne
|  | Democratic
| 1896
|  | Incumbent retired.New member elected.Republican gain.
| nowrap | 

|}

Non-voting delegates 

|-
! 

|-
! 

|-
! 
| James Y. Callahan
|  | Free Silver
| 1896
|  | Incumbent retired.New delegate elected.Republican gain.
| nowrap | 

|}

See also
 1898 United States elections
 1898–99 United States Senate elections
 55th United States Congress
 56th United States Congress

Notes

References

Bibliography

External links
 Office of the Historian (Office of Art & Archives, Office of the Clerk, U.S. House of Representatives)